The following is a list of episodes of ABS-CBN's Mirabella, which stars Julia Barretto, Enrique Gil, Sam Concepcion and Mika dela Cruz. The soap opera premiered on March 24, 2014, replacing Annaliza. Mirabella airs at 5:45pm (PST), Mondays to Fridays during Primetime Bida. The pilot episode ranked #4 on March 24, 2014 with a rating of 22%.

Series overview

Monthly Series Overview 
{| class="wikitable plainrowheaders" style="text-align: center;"
|- class="wikitable" style="text-align: center;"
! style="padding: 0 8px;" colspan="2"| Month
! style="padding: 0 8px;" | Episodes
! style="padding: 0 8px;" | Peak
! style="padding: 0 8px;" | Average Rating
|-
|style="padding: 0 8px; background:green;"| 
| ' style="padding: 0 8px;" |March 2014
|  style="padding: 0 8px;" |6
|  style="padding: 0 8px;" |22.0%  (Episode 1)
|  style="padding: 0 8px;" |18.5%
|-
|style="padding: 0 8px; background:orange;"| 
| ' style="padding: 0 8px;" |April 2014
|  style="padding: 0 8px;" |20
|  style="padding: 0 8px;" |21.5%  (Episode 22)
|  style="padding: 0 8px;" |18.3%
|-
|style="padding: 0 8px; background:Red;"| 
| ' style="padding: 0 8px;" |May 2014
|  style="padding: 0 8px;" |22
|  style="padding: 0 8px;" |23.1%  (Episode 42)
|  style="padding: 0 8px;" |20.0%
|-
|style="padding: 0 8px; background:yellow;"| 
| ' style="padding: 0 8px;" |June 2014
|  style="padding: 0 8px;" |21
|  style="padding: 0 8px;" |21.8%  (Episode 69)
|  style="padding: 0 8px;" |19.6%
|-
|style="padding: 0 8px; background:pink;"| 
| ' style="padding: 0 8px;" |July 2014
|  style="padding: 0 8px;" |4
|  style="padding: 0 8px;" |27.3%  (Episode 73)
|  style="padding: 0 8px;" |24.4%
|}

Episodes

References

Lists of Philippine drama television series episodes
Lists of soap opera episodes